Megono is a Javanese from the region of Central Java, Indonesia. Megono originally comes from the regency of Pekalongan on the north coast of Java, and consists of rice topped with chopped young jackfruit, mixed with grated coconut, along with other spices. Nasi megono is usually served with mendoan, a thin fried, half-cooked, starchy tempeh.

Etymology  
"Megono" comes from the Javanese word mergo, meaning "because", and ono, meaning "there is".

References 

Indonesian rice dishes
Javanese cuisine